Mark "Simo" Simonaitis (born October 1, 1959) is an American race car driver and entrepreneur. He is the twin brother of racer Brian Simo. Currently, he is the CEO of No Fear, and is a co-owner of No Fear Racing.

Simo has made two NASCAR Craftsman Truck Series races, first in his self-owned #94 Mac Tools Ford F-150, and later in the #28 Federated Auto Parts Ford for Ernie Irvan. His best finish was sixth. As an owner, Simo fielded the #44 entry full-time from 1995 to 1998. Joe Ruttman drove the truck in its first season with sponsorship from Coca-Cola, Mac, and 1-800 COLLECT, winning twice. Bryan Reffner drove the next season and won Rookie of the Year, before Boris Said became the team's new driver with Federated sponsoring. In two years, Said won one race at Sears Point. Following the 1998 season, Simo fielded the #14 car part-time in the Winston Cup Series for Said and Randy LaJoie, and in the Busch Series for Irvan. He and Irvan planned to field a full-time Winston Cup entry in 2000, but were unable to find sponsorship and leased their equipment to Robby Gordon.

Motorsports career results

SCCA National Championship Runoffs

NASCAR
(key) (Bold – Pole position awarded by qualifying time. Italics – Pole position earned by points standings or practice time. * – Most laps led.)

Craftsman Truck Series

External links 

American Le Mans Series drivers
American sports businesspeople
Businesspeople from California
Living people
NASCAR drivers
Racing drivers from California
Sportspeople from Carlsbad, California
Trans-Am Series drivers
American twins
Twin sportspeople
SCCA National Championship Runoffs participants
1959 births